John Abraham (born 17 December 1972) is an Indian actor and film producer who works in Hindi films. Known for his stoic action hero persona, he has won a National Film Award (as producer) and received nominations for five Filmfare Awards. 

After a successful modelling career, Abraham made his acting debut with the erotic thriller film Jism (2003), a sleeper hit. He gained success with the action film Dhoom (2004) and expanded to comedic roles in Garam Masala (2005), Taxi No. 9211 (2006), Dostana (2008). He also starred in the critically acclaimed dramas Water (2005), Kabul Express (2006) and New York (2009). In the subsequent decade, Abraham's career fluctuated commercially. He had successes in the ensemble films Housefull 2 (2012), Race 2 (2013), and Welcome Back (2015), and in the acclaimed political thriller Madras Cafe (2013). Abraham subsequently had his biggest commercial successes as a leading man in the action dramas Parmanu (2018), Satyameva Jayate (2018) and Batla House (2019). In 2023, Abraham starred in his highest-grossing release, the action film Pathaan.

Abraham ventured into film production under his banner J.A. Entertainment with Vicky Donor (2012), which won him the National Film Award for Best Popular Film Providing Wholesome Entertainment. He has since produced several of his films, and also wrote the story of Attack: Part 1 (2022). Outside of his film career, he is the co-owner of the Indian Super League football team NorthEast United FC. He is also a vegetarian, and is an advocate for animal rights.

Early life 
Abraham was born in Mumbai, Maharashtra on 17 December 1972 into a family of mixed religious and ethnic heritage. His father is a Malayali Syrian Christian from Kerala and his mother is a Parsi Zoroastrian from Gujarat who has relatives still living in Iran, as many as 21 cousins. Abraham's Zoroastrian name is "Farhan", but he was baptised with the name "John." He has a younger brother named Alan Abraham. He considers himself a spiritual person but does not follow any particular religion. Abraham grew up in Mumbai and studied at the Bombay Scottish School in Mumbai. He attended Jai Hind College, University of Mumbai, and then got an MBA degree from MET Institute of Management, Mumbai. His cousin Susy Matthew is an author and has written novels like In a Bubble of Time.

Career

Modelling career 
Abraham started his modelling career appearing in the music video of the song "Surma" by Punjabi singer Jazzy B. He then joined the media firm and Time & Space Media Entertainment Promotions Ltd., which however got closed because of financial crisis. Later, he worked for Enterprises-Nexus as a media planner. In 1999, he won the Gladrags Manhunt Contest and went to the Philippines for Manhunt International, where he won second place. He later modelled in Hong Kong, London and New York City, and appeared in a number of commercial advertisements and other music videos for singers including Pankaj Udhas, Hans Raj Hans and Babul Supriyo. To improve his acting skills, Abraham joined Kishore Namit Kapoor Acting Institute and completed an acting course while juggling modelling assignments.

Early work and struggle (2003) 

Considered "the top model of India before he ventured into films", Abraham made his acting debut with Jism in 2003, an erotic thriller film which according to Box Office India, was "Hit" grossing . He portrayed the role of Kabir Lal, a poor, alcoholic and wayward lawyer who falls in love with Sonia Khanna (played by Bipasha Basu), a wife of a travelling millionaire, who plots to kill her own husband with the company of Kabir. The film met with mixed to positive reviews. Taran Adarsh of Bollywood Hungama commented: "Supermodel John Abraham makes a confident debut. The actor rises beyond his looks and registers a strong impact with his performance, more so towards the second half. His dashing looks and excellent physique only add to his persona".

In the same year, Abraham appeared in Anurag Basu's horror paranormal romance film Saaya alongside Tara Sharma and Mahima Chaudhry. The film garnered mixed to negative reviews, and underperformed at the box office. Taran Adarsh wrote: "Saaya clearly belongs to John. No two opinions on that! Enacting a very difficult role, the newcomer actually performs like a veteran and delivers a performance that's bound to win him nominations in the awards categories. His growth as an actor is tremendous!"

In 2003, he appeared in Pooja Bhatt's directorial debut film Paap alongside Udita Goswami. He portrayed the role of Shiven, a police officer, who falls for a Buddhist girl, Kaaya. The film underperformed at the box office, receiving mixed reviews, and also was premiered at the Kara Film Festival. That same year, he appeared in Ahmed Khan's film Lakeer – Forbidden Lines, co-starring Nauheed Cyrusi with other stars such as Sunny Deol, Sunil Shetty and Sohail Khan, which also underperformed at the box office.

Recognition and commercial success (2004–2009) 
In 2004, Abraham played Kabir, the main antagonist in Dhoom, an action film directed by Sanjay Gadhvi, and produced by Yash Raj Films, multi-starring Abhishek Bachchan, Esha Deol, Uday Chopra and Rimi Sen. The film was the third highest-grossing film of the year, which gained him a Filmfare Award for Best Performance in a Negative Role nomination.

In 2005, he starred in the action thrillers Elaan and Karam, both of which failed at the box office. He followed with the supernatural thriller Kaal and the comedy Garam Masala, both of which did well at the box office. Later that year, he had a role in Water, which portrayed the tragic fate of Hindu widows in British India of the 1930s. The film was written and directed by independent Canadian film-maker Deepa Mehta. It was popular internationally, and was nominated for the 2006 Academy Award for Best Foreign Language Film at the 79th Academy Awards. Abraham attended the ceremony along with the film's crew and makers but the film lost to Germany's The Lives of Others.

In the summer of 2006, Abraham performed at the "Rockstars Concert" along with fellow Bollywood actors Salman Khan, Zayed Khan, Kareena Kapoor, Esha Deol, Shahid Kapoor and Mallika Sherawat. In that same year, he starred in the films Zinda, Taxi No. 9211, Baabul and Kabul Express. Among these Taxi No. 9211 and Kabul Express were substantially successful. Abraham's performance in Taxi No. 9211 was praised by critics, noting that his performances to be maturing with each new film. Nikhil Advani's multi-starrer Salaam-e-Ishq was Abraham's first release in 2007. The movie failed to do well at the Indian box office, though it did well in the overseas markets. His last two 2007 releases included the thriller No Smoking, and the sports film Dhan Dhana Dhan Goal, in which he sported a new look. The song "Ishq Ka Kalma" with his then-girlfriend Bipasha Basu was a hit song of that year.

In 2008, Abraham starred alongside Abhishek Bachchan and Priyanka Chopra in Dostana, his only release that year. His first release of 2009 was a production by Yash Raj Films, New York. Dostana was a commercial success and grossed 871 million Indian Rupees Worldwide. This was a turning point in his career.

Established actor and critical acclaim (2010–2019) 
He has a fashion line – branded JA Clothes – which primarily features his favourite article of clothing, jeans.

In 2010, he was seen in the films Aashayein and Jhootha Hi Sahi. Both of the films turned out to be box office failures. Lately, Abraham has appeared in the films Force (2011), Desi Boyz (2011) and Housefull 2 (2012). Force and Housefull 2 were huge successes at the box office. Force earned 1.5 billion Indian Rupees Worldwide and Housefull 2 earned 1.86 billion Indian Rupees Worldwide. His first film of 2013 was the multi-starrer Race 2 which was commercially successful earning over 1.8 billion Indian Rupees Worldwide though his second release, the coming-of-age romantic comedy I, Me Aur Main, underperformed at the box office. His next release was Shootout at Wadala, in which he portrayed the role of a gangster Manya Surve, which gained positive reviews. The film emerged as a success at the box office. Then his movie Madras Cafe, which was also a second movie for him as a producer, garnered much critical acclaim, also the collections of the movie saw an upward trend after terrific word-of-mouth. His next release was Welcome Back, which was successful at the box office earning about 1.7 Billion Indian Rupees Worldwide. 

In 2016, his first release was Rocky Handsome which was an average grosser at the box office. Then, his second release of the year was Dishoom, and despite mixed to negative reviews, the film was a commercial success and made almost 1.2 billion Indian Rupees Worldwide. His next release of the year was Force 2, the sequel of the 2011 film Force. Force 2 became the highest opening film for Abraham and opened with mixed to positive reviews. Abraham's performance received praise from the audience and critics. His next films in 2018 were the action films Parmanu: The Story of Pokhran with Diana Penty & Boman Irani and Satyameva Jayate with Manoj Bajpayee & Neha Sharma's younger sister Aisha Sharma. Satyameva Jayate was commercially successful earning 1.10 billion Indian Rupees Worldwide.  In 2019, he starred in the action thrillers Romeo Akbar Walter and he played Mrunal Thakur's husband ACP Sanjay Kumar in Nikkhil Advani's Batla House, based on the 2008 Batla House encounter case.

Few setbacks and Pathaan (2020–present) 

In 2021, Abraham appeared in Mumbai Saga and Satyameva Jayate 2, both of which were box office disasters. He did a cameo in his own production Sardar Ka Grandson alongside Arjun Kapoor and Aditi Rao Hydari, that streamed on Netflix. He produced, wrote and acted in the story of science-fiction actioner Attack: Part 1 (2022), where he co-starred with Rakul Preet Singh and Jacqueline Fernandez. The film released threatically on April 2022 with mixed reviews from critics who praised the action sequences while criticizing the screenplay, Taran Adarsh of Bollywood Hungama wrote, "Attack: Part 1 works due to the novel concept, action, VFX and John Abraham’s first-rate performance". The film grossed  crore in India and  crore overseas, for a worldwide gross collection of  crore eventually bombing at the box office.

In his second release of 2022, he starred as Bhairav Purohit co-starring Disha Patani, Arjun Kapoor and Tara Sutaria in Mohit Suri's psychological thriller Ek Villain Returns. The film released theatrically on July 2022 and opened to mixed reviews from critics. Sukanya Vema of Rediff wrote, "Ek Villain Returns falls back on the popularity of the Galliyan track to boost its appeal". In November 2022, he produced along with Bhushan Kumar and Krishan Kumar the romantic comedy film Tara Vs Bilal starring Harshvardhan Rane and Sonia Rathee.

His first release of 2023 came with Siddharth Anand's mass action thriller Pathaan produced by YRF, co-starring Shah Rukh Khan and Deepika Padukone. It is the fourth instalment in the YRF Spy Universe. Principal photography for Pathaan began in November 2020. The film was shot over various locations. Pathaan was released in India on 25 January 2023, coinciding with the Republic Day. It received positive reviews from critics and broke several box-office records, including the biggest opening day and opening weekend for a Hindi film. Taran Adarsh of Bollywood Hungama termed the film a "complete entertainer replete with action, emotions, patriotism, humour, thrill, and of course, the star power of Shah Rukh Khan".

Abraham has other releases of 2023 are Tehran and Tariq, both directed by Arun Gopalan, with the former produced by Dinesh Vijan and latter produced by himself. In addition he is supposed to star in an untitled Sajid Khan-directed comedy with Riteish Deshmukh and the remake of the 2020 Malayalam film, Ayyappanum Koshiyum.

Producer 
Abraham's debut as a producer was titled Vicky Donor (2012) and the film featured Ayushmann Khurrana, Annu Kapoor and Yami Gautam in lead roles. Abraham also appeared in an item-number for the film. It opened to positive response, and turned out to be a critical and commercial success. His second production, Madras Cafe which was also directed by Shoojit Sircar, opened to overwhelming response from the critics. In 2018, he produced the Marathi film Savita Damodar Paranjpe.

Personal life 
During the filming of Jism in 2002, Abraham began to date his co-star Bipasha Basu. They were in a relationship until early 2011. While together, the two were often referred to as a supercouple in the Indian media. Abraham once stated, "I have always kept quiet about my personal life and will continue to maintain a dignified silence. It's just the way my parents raised me. I rather leave it at speculation." The couple broke up in 2011.

Abraham is now married to Priya Runchal, an Indian-American financial analyst and investment banker from the United States but native to McLeod Ganj, whom he met in Mumbai, in December 2010. They married on 3 January 2014. Runchal is also the chairperson of NorthEast United FC.

Abraham is a fitness model and he abstains from smoking, consuming alcohol and any intoxicants. Due to this, he often avoids many parties and functions.

Abraham is a sport bike collector.

Off-screen work 

Abraham also takes an active interest in the United Way, based in Denver, United States. In January 2009, he flagged off the Mumbai Marathon, an annual event organised to benefit the United Way. He did not run the marathon, but encouraged the participants by waving at them from the start line.

Abraham is an animal lover and takes an interest in PETA and Habitat for Humanity. In April 2013, on behalf of PETA, Abraham wrote a letter to the Minister for Environment and Forests, Jayanthi Natarajan, asking that she make all circuses in India animal-free.

Abraham is also the celebrity supporter of UNHCR India, and promotes the cause of refugees in India. According to his website, he donated  to the Lilavati Hospital and Research Centre, Mumbai.

Filmography

Accolades

Notes

References

External links 

 
 
 

1972 births
Living people
21st-century Indian male actors
Film producers from Mumbai
Hindi film producers
Indian male film actors
Indian male models
Irani people
Jai Hind College alumni
Malayali people
Male actors from Mumbai
Male actors in Hindi cinema
Producers who won the Best Popular Film Providing Wholesome Entertainment National Film Award
International Indian Film Academy Awards winners
Zee Cine Awards winners
Indian football chairmen and investors